Gene Lyons (February 9, 1921 – July 8, 1974) was an American television actor perhaps best known for his role as police commissioner Dennis Randall on the NBC detective series Ironside starring Raymond Burr.

Career
Born in Pittsburgh, Lyons was a life member of The Actors Studio and co-starred in the Broadway production of Witness for the Prosecution for two years. His other Broadway credits include Masquerade (1958), The Trip to Bountiful (1953), Harriet (1942), and This Rock (1942).

In 1953, Lyons played a police detective on the CBS drama series Pentagon U.S.A.. He appeared in 1954 as Steve Rockwell on the CBS daytime drama Woman with a Past. In 1963 Lyons appeared as Sheriff Jonathan Ballard on the TV western The Virginian in the episode titled "If You Have Tears." 

Before joining Raymond Burr as a regular on Ironside, he appeared on Perry Mason in 1965 as murderer Ralph Balfour in "The Case of the Wrathful Wraith." He also made guest appearances on nearly two dozen other series including The Dick Van Dyke Show, Gunsmoke (“Bently”), Have Gun, Will Travel, The Fugitive, Ben Casey, Star Trek ("A Taste of Armageddon"), The Twilight Zone ("King Nine Will Not Return"), The Alfred Hitchcock Hour, Bonanza ("Shining in Spain") and The Untouchables. He also appeared in films including The Young Don't Cry and Kiss Her Goodbye.

Death
Lyons was 53 years old when he died in Los Angeles from complications related to chronic alcoholism, and is buried at Calvary Catholic Cemetery in Pittsburgh.

Filmography

References

External links

Gene Lyons at the Internet Off-Broadway Database

1921 births
1974 deaths
20th-century American male actors
Male actors from Pittsburgh
American male television actors
American male soap opera actors
Burials at Calvary Catholic Cemetery (Pittsburgh)